Sergiusz Piasecki (1901 in Lachowicze near Baranowicze – 1964 in Penley, London) was one of the best known Belarusian-Polish writers of the mid 20th century. He was mainly portraying life of criminals and lowlifes of Minsk, which he knew very well, as well as work of Polish spies in Soviet Union and later the anti-Nazi conspiracy in Wilno; he had personal experience in both matters.

His novel written in prison, Lover of the Great Bear, published in 1937, was the third most popular novel in the Second Polish Republic. Following World War II, Piasecki's books were banned by communist censorship in the People's Republic of Poland.

After the collapse of the Soviet Union, in early 1990s, Lover of the Great Bear became again one of the best selling books in the country according to Rzeczpospolita daily newspaper. His other novel, an Anti-Soviet satire The Memoirs of a Red Army Officer, had already been reprinted several times.

Early life 
Sergiusz Piasecki was born on April 1, 1901 (or June 1, 1899) in Lachowicze, 130 km from Minsk, then in Northwestern Krai of the Russian Empire (now Brest Province, Belarus). The latter date was presented by Piasecki on several occasions, in order to mislead the authorities. He was an illegitimate son of an impoverished russified Polish nobleman Michal Piasecki and a mother Klaudia Kukalowicz, a Belarusian peasant, working as a servant for the Piasecki family, whom he has never met. He was looked after by his stepmother Filomena Gruszewska, who bullied him physically and mentally. His family spoke exclusively in Russian at home and he didn't learn Polish language until his later imprisonment.

His childhood was very difficult because children at school mocked his Polish roots, calling him "Lach" (which, in loose translation, is the Russian equivalent of the ethnic slur Polack). Piasecki hated the Russian school – as he later explained – and in the seventh grade, armed with a pistol attacked the teacher. Sentenced to jail, he escaped from prison, and thus his formal education ended.

After he run away from jain, he headed to Moscow, where he experienced October Revolution and watched his close friends' deaths. It was then that his disgust with communist ideology started.

During the revolution he traveled to Minsk, where he got to know the criminal underworld. In Minsk he joined troops fighting for Belarusian independence. Those were soon defeated, and Piasecki himself got wounded. After that he joined the Polish 1st Lithuanian–Belarusian Division which at this time had taken over Minsk and was heading east with offensive (see: Polish–Soviet War); he took part in Battle of Warsaw (1920).

From 7th of April 1920 to 10th of January 1921, he studied in army officers school Szkoła Podchorążych Piechoty as Belarusian in the 29th United Polish-Belarusian class. He was demobilised on May 12, 1921.

After leaving the army Sergiusz Piasecki found himself in a very difficult situation. He had no education, and his father's estate remained abroad. He had walked the distance from Minsk to Wilno to visit his brother, who lived in poverty himself and couldn't help Sergiusz. He traveled around Wileńszczyzna hustling, falsifying bank cheques and acting in pornographic photoshoots. He has described this episode of his life in a book The Life of a Disarmed Man.

Ambiguities 
In the monograph about his life, work and legend, researcher Krzysztof Polechoński noted that most available data about Piasecki's whereabouts often do not correspond to reality, not to mention the claims made by the writer himself. Perhaps the discrepancies came from his work as intelligence agent, but there is no way to confirm many of his personal stories. Piasecki's addresses in Vilnius are not available and neither are the registers of houses in which he lived. His personal documents in possession of Piasecki's son: such as the copy of a marriage certificate with Jadwiga Waszkiewicz or the birth certificate of his son Władysław Tomaszewicz are falsifications, as revealed by Polechoński himself after a search performed in Vilnius archives. It is not possible to say whether his evacuation card is authentic. There is no photo of him in the prisoners' photo archives of Łukiszki penitentiary. There is no proof of his residency amongst the Vilnius city dwellers. He might have stayed in a hotel.

Self-generated legend
Sławomir Andruszkiewicz noted, that Piasecki boasted in "The Tower of Babel" about his many false papers, thus making it difficult even for himself to pull out the correct one every time. The researchers are unable to prove any of his family names, surnames and pseudonyms used during the war. It is impossible to explain, said Andruszkiewicz, why so many of his official statements contain made up facts. It is not known what underground organizations Piasecki belonged to as there is no proof of any.

According to his autobiographical writing, at the time of the Bolshevik takeover of Russia in November 1917, Piasecki at age sixteen, found himself in Moscow. He saw with his own eyes the barbarity of the Bolshevik revolution, and from then on, became an avid anti-Communist. Some time in 1918 or 1919, he returned to Belarus, joining the Belarusian anti-Soviet units called Zialony Dub ("Green Oak"), led by ataman Wiaczeslaw Adamowicz. Thus, a Belarusian unit under Polish command was created, and soon Piasecki was transferred to Warsaw's school of infantry cadets. In the summer of 1920, Piasecki fought in the Battle of Radzymin, and this experience tied him with Poland for the rest of his life. Afterwards, he
was asked to join Polish intelligence, as his language skills (he spoke Russian and Belarusian fluently) were highly regarded.

Work for the Polish intelligence service
In early 1920s, Piasecki skillfully organized a whole web of Polish agents, covering the area of Soviet Belarus. His supervisors were very pleased with his work, but they did not have enough money to cover all expenses incurred by Piasecki and the growing number of his men. So, the enterprising agent found another source of income – smuggling. Moreover, this was not only about the money. Foreign spies as a rule were all executed by the Soviets, while smugglers were only incarcerated for a few years. As he wrote – he smuggled cocaine to the USSR, taking furs back to Poland. This provided him with a fortune, but Piasecki did not keep the money to himself. He needed it to bribe the Soviet prison guards, as his men were frequently caught and incarcerated.

In February 1926 Piasecki was fired from the Polish intelligence. It is not clear why this happened. Allegedly, he discovered connections between Soviets and some Polish V.I.P.'s. Also, he was at odds with his fellow smugglers. Destitute, he found himself in a desperate situation. All that he possessed was a revolver. In late July 1926, Piasecki was wandering in the forests south of Wilno. Armed, he decided to rob two Jews, Jodel Boryszanski and Morduch Drazlin, who were crossing the forest in a cart. He stole from them 1,054 zlotys, a gold watch and other items. Later, it was established that Piasecki was under the influence of cocaine, and he needed the money to cover bail for his friend, Antoni Niewiarowicz. A few days later, Piasecki and Niewiarowicz robbed a suburban train near Wilno, and, due to Niewiarowicz's lover's confession, they were caught, tried and put in jail in Lida.

As his trial took place in the border area, the Lida court was merciless and sentenced Piasecki to death. Fortunately, his former supervisors from the intelligence did not forget about their agent, and so instead of being executed, Piasecki ended up with 15 years imprisonment. His stay in the Lida prison was short. As a leader of a rebellion, he was moved to Rawicz. There, he incited another riot, and was moved to Koronowo and later to Wronki. Finally, Piasecki was transferred to the hardest prison in Poland, located in Łysa Góra near Kielce. As he was regarded a troublesome
prisoner, he was often kept in isolation ward, where he got sick with tuberculosis.

Writing in prison

Piasecki became a writer by chance. Later, he confessed that many prisoners in Wronki would write, so he decided to emulate them. As his knowledge of standard Polish was poor, he would learn from a school book of Polish grammar. Some time in either 1935 or 1936, his prison prose came to the attention of a famous novelist and journalist, Melchior Wańkowicz, who toured Polish prisons as a reporter. The publication and resulting popularity of the book became the catalyst for getting Piasecki out of prison. The book was published while Piasecki was still in prison, and its copy was delivered to his cell. The book sold out within a month, it was the third most popular publication of interwar Poland.

Due to popularity of the book, Wańkowicz's efforts to release Piasecki were supported by other writers and lawyers. Finally, in 1937 president Ignacy Mościcki pardoned him. The day of his release was sensational, crowds of journalists were waiting at a gate, and Piasecki himself was shocked at technical novelties, such as radio, which had become common since 1926. In late 1937 and early 1938, Piasecki went to Otwock and Zakopane, to recuperate. Among others, he met Witkacy (Stanisław Ignacy Witkiewicz), who painted his portrait. Being a celebrity, he avoided meeting with numerous readers, neither did he like signing of books.

World War II activities
In the summer of 1939 Piasecki went to Wilno where he stayed during the invasion of Poland in World War II. In September 1939, he volunteered to the Border Defence Corps, to fight the Soviets. During the occupation of Poland, he was offered a chance to move to France, but refused and decided to stay in his occupied homeland. Even though he had never been a member of the Home Army (he said he worked for its executive branch No 2, which – like many of his stories – was never confirmed), he had cooperated with the Polish resistance, and in 1943 became an executioner, carrying out capital punishment sentences handed down by underground Polish courts. His wartime noms de guerre were "Sucz", "Kira" and "Konrad". Later, he wrote two books about his war activities. Among those who he was ordered to execute, was Józef Mackiewicz, falsely accused of cooperating with the Germans. However, Piasecki refused to kill him, and later it was revealed that Mackiewicz's accusations had been made up by the Soviets.

Living in exile
After the war, Piasecki hid from the secret police for a year inside Poland. In April 1946, he escaped to Italy, where he spotted the Italian translation of his own . Soon, he got in touch with Polish writers living in exile, including Jerzy Giedroyc. In 1947, Piasecki moved to England, his name can be found on a resolution of Union of Polish Writers in Exile, which urged all concerned to stop publishing in the Communist-occupied country. He once publicly declared that he would gladly take any job that would result in erasing Communism.

Living abroad, Piasecki did not stop writing. In late 1940s he came to the conclusion that humor was the best weapon to fight the Communists. So, he wrote a satire The memoirs of a Red Army officer, which presents a made-up diary of Mishka Zubov - an officer of the Red Army, who, together with his unit enters Poland on September 17, 1939. Zubov claims in his "diary" that his only purpose is to kill all the bourgeoisie who possess watches and bicycles. Piasecki became fluent in English as an adult. Sergiusz Piasecki died in 1964 in London at the age of 65. On his tomb, located in Hastings Cemetery, England, it is said that he was born on June 1, 1899.

Bibliography 
 The Fifth Stage (Piąty Etap) - autobiographical novel about work of a spy on Polish - Soviet frontier. Written in prison in April 1934. Published for the first time by Towarzystwo Wydawnicze „Rój" in 1938. 
 Lover of the Great Bear (Kochanek Wielkiej Niedźwiedzicy) - action novel, describing life of smugglers on Polish-Soviet frontier. Written in prison in April 1935. Published for the first time by Towarzystwo Wydawnicze „Rój" in 1939. Translated to English by John Mann and published by George Routledge & Sons, LTD in 1938.
 Red haired Ewa (Ruda Ewa) - short story written in prison in 1936.
 Road to a wall (Drogą pod mur) - autobiography of his childhood written in jail in may 1937.
 Night's Gods' Equals (Bogom Nocy Równi) - sequel to the Fifth Stage. 1938 Towarzystwo Wydawnicze „Rój". 1989 Towarzystwo Wydawnicze „Graf”.
 One Hundred Questions addressed to the 'nowadays' Warsaw (Sto pytań pod adresem „obecnej” Warszawy) - political memorial. Written in 1946, published in 1947, Rome.
 Thief's Trilogy (Trylogia Złodziejska) - series of three books portraying life of criminal underworld in Minsk. Each takes place under different authorities: Polish, Nazi German and Soviet. All book titles are based on popular songs, first two being criminals and prison songs. The last title is a phrase taken from The Internationale. Published in Rome by Instytut Literacki. 
 Apple (Jabłuszko) - 1946.
 I will look in a window (Spojrze ja w okno) - 1947.
 There are no supreme saviours (Nikt nie da nam zbawienia) - 1947.
 Lucifer's Seven Pills (7 Pigułek Lucyfera) - grotesque satire  about first years of Polish People's Republic after the war. (London, 1948)
 Shreds of Legend (Strzęp Legendy) - short story about Nazi German occupation of Poland (London, 1949)
 The Memoirs of a Red Army Officer (Zapiski Oficera Armii Czerwonej) - satire about Soviet occupation of Wilno and Lida, seen from perspective of indoctrinated Russian soldier. (London, Gryf Publications LTD 1957).
 The Life of a Disarmed Man - story of a demobilised veteran of the 1920 Polish–Soviet War (London, B. Świderski 1962; first version written in jail in 1935).
 Adam and Ewa (Adam i Ewa) - story of a difficult love of two people during the war of 1939 in Vilnius Region (Wileńszczyźna) (published in chapters in a newspaper, 1963)
 Babel Tower (Wieża Babel) - Polish Underground State and anti-Nazi German conspiracy during Second World War in Vilnius Region. (London, Polska Fundacja Kulturalna 1964)
 A Man Turned into a Wolf (Człowiek Przemieniony w Wilka) - conspiracy in years 1939 to 1942.
 For Honour of the Organisation (Dla honoru Organizacji) - Home Army execution squad activity 1942 to 1943.
 Soon before his death, Sergiusz Piasecki started working on the last chapter which would conclude the series with years 1943 to 1945.

See also
Polish literature

References

1901 births
1964 deaths
People from Lyakhavichy
People from Slutsky Uyezd
Polish male writers
Belarusian writers
Polish crime writers
Polish anti-communists
Polish spies
20th-century Polish writers
Polish people of Belarusian descent
Home Army members
Burials at Hastings Cemetery